This is a list of Latin American and the Caribbean countries by gross domestic product at purchasing power parity in international dollars according to the International Monetary Fund's estimates in the April 2022 World Economic Outlook database.

The Latin American countries Brazil, Mexico, Argentina, Colombia, and Chile are the region's largest economies by gross domestic product (GDP) at purchasing power parity (PPP).

Cuba is not included in the list due to lack of economic data. Falkland islands is a territory of Great Britain. The Netherlands currently holds Aruba as a territory. Puerto Rico is a United States territory with special status and the World Economic Outlook maintains statistical data for these reasons the countries economic GDP is on a separate and independent basis.

List

See also 
Community of Latin American and Caribbean States
List of countries by GDP (PPP)
List of countries by GDP (PPP) per capita
List of countries by GNI (PPP) per capita
List of countries by Human Development Index
List of countries by industrial production growth rate
List of countries by percentage of population living in poverty
List of countries by real GDP growth rate
List of Latin American and Caribbean countries by GDP growth
List of Latin American and Caribbean countries by GDP (nominal)
List of Latin American countries by population

Notes

References 

Latin America and the Caribbean
Lists of countries by GDP
Gross domestic product
Gdp (Ppp)
Gdp (Ppp)